Stigmella hamishella is a moth of the family Nepticulidae. It is found in New Zealand.

The length of the forewings is about 4 mm. Adults have been recorded in December.

The larvae feed on Olearia moschata. They mine the leaves of their host plant. The mine consists of blotches, mainly on the lower leaves.

References

External links
Fauna of New Zealand - Number 16: Nepticulidae (Insecta: Lepidoptera)

Nepticulidae
Moths of New Zealand
Moths described in 1989
Endemic fauna of New Zealand
Endemic moths of New Zealand